Francis North, 4th Earl of Guilford (25 December 1761 – 11 January 1817), styled The Honourable Francis North until 1802, was a British peer, Army officer, and playwright.

North was the second son of Frederick North, 2nd Earl of Guilford. On 8 July 1777, he was commissioned an ensign in the 58th (Rutlandshire) Regiment of Foot. On 27 January 1778, he became a cornet in the 2nd Dragoons, and in December 1778 or May 1779 was promoted lieutenant in the 2nd Dragoon Guards. On 29 April 1780, he became a captain in the 96th Regiment of Foot.

Capt. North was appointed aide-de-camp in extraordinary to Frederick Howard, 5th Earl of Carlisle, the new Lord Lieutenant of Ireland, on 30 December 1780, a post he held for the duration of Carlisle's tenure in office. On 9 April 1781, he exchanged into the 49th Regiment of Foot. On 22 April 1783, he was promoted major in the 83rd Regiment of Foot, which regiment, however, was disbanded the following year.

North was also a playwright, and his drama, The Kentish Baron, was produced at the Haymarket in 1791 and deemed a success. On 9 September 1794, he was promoted to lieutenant-colonel. He was appointed lieutenant of Dover Castle in 1795 and captain of Deal Castle in 1799, succeeding his elder brother George North, 3rd Earl of Guilford in 1802. On 5 May 1803, he was appointed a deputy lieutenant of Kent.

He married Maria Boycott on 19 July 1810, but had no children by her. Upon his death in 1817 in Pisa, he was succeeded in the earldom by his brother, Frederick North, 5th Earl of Guilford.

References

External links

1761 births
1817 deaths
18th-century English nobility
19th-century English nobility
18th-century British dramatists and playwrights
2nd Dragoon Guards (Queen's Bays) officers
49th Regiment of Foot officers
58th Regiment of Foot officers
Deputy Lieutenants of Kent
Earls of Guilford
Royal Scots Greys officers
Francis
Children of prime ministers of the United Kingdom
Barons Guilford